The Ironbridge Gorge Museum Trust is an industrial heritage organisation which runs ten museums and manages multiple historic sites within the Ironbridge Gorge World Heritage Site in Shropshire, England, widely considered as the birthplace of the Industrial Revolution.

The Gorge includes a number of settlements important to industrial history and with heritage assets, including Ironbridge, Coalport and Jackfield along the River Severn, and also Coalbrookdale and Broseley. The area was among the first sites in the United Kingdom to be declared a World Heritage Site by UNESCO in 1986.

Museums
The ten museum sites run by the Trust, collectively known as The Ironbridge Gorge Museums are:

 Blists Hill Victorian Town, including the Hay Inclined Plane
 Broseley Pipeworks
 Coalbrookdale Museum of Iron
 Coalport China Museum
 Tar Tunnel
 Darby Houses
 Enginuity
 Iron Bridge and Tollhouse
 Jackfield Tile Museum
 Museum of the Gorge

The Trust
The Ironbridge Gorge Museum Trust was established in 1968 to preserve and interpret the birthplace of the Industrial Revolution in the Ironbridge Gorge. It is an independent educational charity. From 1970 it absorbed the Coalbrookdale Museum, now the Coalbrookdale Museum of Iron, which had been established in 1959.

The museum staff manage 35 historic sites within the Ironbridge Gorge World Heritage Site, including ten museums. The sites also include archaeological sites, two chapels, housing, two Quaker burial grounds, a research library, a tourist information centre, woodland, and two youth hostels.

Ironbridge International Institute for Cultural Heritage
The Ironbridge International Institute for Cultural Heritage, formerly the Ironbridge Institute, is a centre for cross-disciplinary research, postgraduate teaching and policy engagement based at the University of Birmingham.

References

External links 

Ironbridge Gorge Museum Trust website

 
Ironbridge Gorge
Museums in Shropshire
Coalbrookdale
Industry museums in England
Open-air museums in England
Archaeological museums in England
History of Shropshire
Industrial archaeology
Industrial Revolution in England
European Route of Industrial Heritage Anchor Points
Charities based in Shropshire
Museums established in 1967
Organizations established in 1967
1967 establishments in England